Temnora burdoni is a moth of the family Sphingidae. It is known from Tanzania.

The length of the forewings is about 22 mm. It is similar to Temnora argyropeza, but the antennae are longer and thicker, the forewings shorter and the hindwing upperside has a diffuse brown marginal band through which the orange ground colour almost reaches the margins. The forewing upperside ground colour is purplish-brown with a slight violet gloss and a broad diffuse dark brown band running from the middle of the costa to the tornus, below which are two faint paler spots. The submarginal band is paler, crenulated and thicker at costa. The forewing underside basal three-quarters are uniform brick red, but paler at the costa and along the inner margin. The hindwing upperside is orange with narrow dark brown margin through which the orange ground colour almost reaches the margins. The hindwing underside is brown with darker scales.

References

Temnora
Moths described in 1968
Insects of Tanzania
Fauna of Zambia
Moths of Africa